Henry Groves & Son is an organ builder in England.

Company
The company was established in 1957 by Alvin Henry Groves. He had learned his trade in the company of Henry Willis & Sons. 

In 1969 he acquired the Nottingham based company of E. Wragg & Son.

Alvin Henry Groves retired in 1991, and the business was taken over by his grandson, Jonathan Wallace.

In 1994 Henry Groves acquired the Johnson Organ Company.

Work
New organs have included:
St. Michael's Church, Linby 2005
All Saints' Church, Wingerworth 2006
St. Edmund's Church, Mansfield Woodhouse 2008
St Giles' Church, Balderton 2010

The company has restored many organs in the East Midlands area including 
Nottingham Cathedral 1995
The Priory, Deeping St James 2012
All Saints' Church, Matlock 2004
St. Peter and St. Paul's Church, Shelford 2004
Holy Trinity Church, Rolleston 2008
St Oswald's Church, Ashbourne 2011
St Mary's Church, Melton Mowbray 2018

References

External links
Company website

Pipe organ building companies
Organ builders of the United Kingdom
Manufacturing companies of England
Manufacturing companies established in 1957
1957 establishments in England